Lou Dobbs Tonight was an American political and financial talk program that was hosted by Lou Dobbs.

The program initially aired on CNN from its launch under the title Moneyline, as its main financial news program. The program later shifted to an opinion-based format focusing on political and economic commentary, and was likewise renamed Lou Dobbs Tonight. Field correspondents provided additional reporting and occasionally served as guest anchors. During Dobbs' tenure, prominent politicians and economists were regular guests on the show.

On November 11, 2009, Lou Dobbs stepped down from CNN. On March 14, 2011, Dobbs moved to Fox Business, hosting a new incarnation of Lou Dobbs Tonight. On February 5, 2021, Fox Business canceled Lou Dobbs Tonight after nearly 10 years on the channel, after a defamation lawsuit was filed against Fox News by Smartmatic over statements made by Dobbs and other Fox Business and Fox News anchors.

History

CNN era 
Lou Dobbs Tonight began with the name Moneyline with the premiere of CNN, and was CNN's main financial show for over 20 years, for a large portion of those years airing on CNN International as well.

In late 1997, Dobbs hired former ABC News and NBC News Executive Producer David Bohrman to turn the program into a more general evening newscast, which would be called The Moneyline NewsHour. The program was half financially focused, and half general news. It was the first regular program at CNN to have its main control room outside of Atlanta.

As the show moved more towards general news and economic and political commentary, it was renamed Lou Dobbs Moneyline and then Lou Dobbs Tonight.  The show was among CNN's most watched.

On November 4, 2006, a taped weekend edition of Lou Dobbs Tonight, entitled Lou Dobbs this Week, began airing. The weekend show, which aired every Saturday and Sunday night, discussed issues from the past week and the week ahead.

On November 11, 2009, Lou Dobbs left the network, telling viewers that the night's episode of Lou Dobbs Tonight was his last and that "some leaders in media, politics and business have been urging me to go beyond the role here at CNN". Although he had a contract with CNN until the end of 2011, CNN agreed to release him early. It was announced that John King would host a new program in the timeslot, and that the transitional program CNN Tonight (initially hosted by John Roberts) would replace Lou Dobbs Tonight in the meantime. John King's new program, John King, USA, debuted in Lou Dobbs' timeslot on March 22, 2010.

Fox Business era 
On November 10, 2010, Fox Business Network announced that Dobbs would join the channel. On March 3, 2011, it was announced that Dobbs' program would premiere on March 14, and that it would also be known as Lou Dobbs Tonight. 

Lou Dobbs Tonight would become the network's highest-rated series, especially during the presidency of Donald Trump—whom Dobbs regularly supported on-air.

On February 5, 2021, Fox Business abruptly cancelled Lou Dobbs Tonight. Dobbs was one of several anchors that had been named in a defamation lawsuit against Fox News by voting machine vendor Smartmatic, which accused the parties of spreading conspiracy theories alleging that it was responsible for voter fraud during the 2020 presidential election. The program was replaced in its timeslot by Fox Business Tonight, which is hosted by various Fox Business anchors.

Regular features
One regular feature on the show was "Exporting America", in which Dobbs documented the American companies that had outsourced jobs to overseas facilities, as well as those businesses that had taken special steps to keep jobs on U.S. soil.  Dobbs had compiled a list of companies that had outsourced that he had posted on the show's website and occasionally repeated on the air.  Dobbs frequently criticized U.S. international trade policy as insufficiently protecting American jobs, advocating in favor of what many consider to be economic protectionism in contrast to free trade. As part of his criticism of globalization, Dobbs often noted that the United States is running trade deficits with virtually every major trading partner it has, especially China. As well, the journalist has published a book titled Exporting America: Why Corporate Greed Is Shipping American Jobs Overseas detailing the individuals and interests behind the exporting of U.S. jobs overseas.

Another regular feature was "Broken Borders", which highlighted what Dobbs considered to be the problems and costs associated with illegal immigrants, and the inefficiencies in the U.S. Border Patrol and immigration policies in general. Dobbs has remained consistent on this view on the Fox Business Network as well.

Correspondents and production
Kitty Pilgrim was a correspondent for the CNN version of the program, and the most frequent substitute anchor when Dobbs was not on. Other reporters attached to CNN's Lou Dobbs Tonight included Dana Bash, Lisa Sylvester and Suzanne Malveaux. The show was broadcast live from CNN's New York studios, located in the Time Warner Center. The Fox Business version of the program originated from Studio B at the News Corp. Building, then towards the end, from a home studio on Dobbs' farm in Wantage Township in Sussex County, New Jersey.

Ratings
Its highest-rated show in 2008 was the day after the presidential election—two million viewers, according to Nielsen Media Research data. At Fox Business, he had maintained a multi-year lead as the top business program in his time slot and overall on television.

References

External links
 Lou Dobbs Tonight website
 

1980 American television series debuts
1980s American television news shows
1990s American television news shows
2000s American television news shows
2009 American television series endings
2010s American television news shows
2011 American television series debuts
2020s American television news shows
2021 American television series endings
CNN original programming
Fox Business original programming
English-language television shows